Kouka is a department or commune of Banwa Province in western Burkina Faso. Its capital is the town of Kouka. According to the 2019 census the department has a total population of 73,747.

Towns and villages
The largest towns and villages and populations in the department are as follows:

 Kouka	(10,187 inhabitants) (capital)
 Bankouma	(3 349 inhabitants)
 Bourawali	(417 inhabitants)
 Diontala	(4,191 inhabitants)
 Fini	(3,009 inhabitants)
 Houna	(3,483 inhabitants)
 Kouelworo	(923 inhabitants)
 Koulakou	(1,454 inhabitants)
 Kouroumani	(2,359 inhabitants)
 Liaba	(541 inhabitants)
 Mahouana	(7,019 inhabitants)
 Mollé	(3,539 inhabitants)
 Saint-Michel	(667 inhabitants)
 Sallé	(2,930 inhabitants)
 Sama	(3,853 inhabitants)
 Sélenkoro	(1 111 inhabitants)
 Siwi	(4,383 inhabitants)

References

Departments of Burkina Faso
Banwa Province